Dorcadion glaucum is a species of beetle in the family Cerambycidae. It was described by Faldermann in 1837. It is known from Azerbaijan and Iran.

Subspecies
 Dorcadion glaucum glaucum Faldermann, 1837
 Dorcadion glaucum lassallei Lazarev, 2015
 Dorcadion glaucum murzinianus Lazarev, 2015

References

glaucum
Beetles described in 1837